Paulo Sérgio Moreira Gonçalves (born 24 January 1984), known as Paulo Sérgio, is a retired Portuguese footballer who plays as an attacking midfielder or right winger.

He amassed Primeira Liga totals of 162 matches and 13 goals over eight seasons, appearing in the competition for Académica, Belenenses, Estrela da Amadora, Aves, Olhanense, Vitória de Guimarães and Arouca. He also competed professionally in Spain, Cyprus, Singapore and Indonesia, winning the S.League with DPMM and repeating the feat in Liga 1 with Bhayangkara and Bali United.

Club career
Born in Lisbon, Paulo Sérgio started his career at local Sporting CP, but never appeared in the Primeira Liga with the first team. In April 2003, 10% of his economic rights were sold to an investment fund along with other youth products, and he would be loaned several times in the following years, for example spending two seasons with Lisbon neighbours C.F. Os Belenenses; on 25 November 2004, before leaving for the latter club, he appeared for the Lions in a 4–0 win at FC Dinamo Tbilisi for that season's UEFA Cup, coming on as a substitute for Roudolphe Douala in the 65th minute.

After one season with Portimonense S.C. of the second division, Paulo Sérgio was released by Sporting and signed with Spanish side UD Salamanca. He appeared in roughly half of the games during the campaign, as the Castile and León team finished ninth in the second level.

Paulo Sérgio returned to his country and Algarve in summer 2009, joining S.C. Olhanense who had just promoted to the top flight and being regularly played over the course of two seasons as the club managed to consecutively retain its status. On 17 September 2010, he scored in a 2–0 home win against former team Portimonense, the first of two official goals during his tenure.

In the following years, Paulo Sérgio represented, in quick succession, Vitória de Guimarães, Cyprus' AEL Limassol, F.C. Arouca and Olhanense. In March 2015, after spending the first part of the campaign as a free agent, he joined DPMM FC of the S.League, replacing injured Craig Fagan. He scored a brace on his debut on 4 April, helping to a 3–2 win at Hougang United FC.

Paulo Sérgio netted twice in a 4–0 victory against Balestier Khalsa FC in the final league game of 2015, and his team won their first-ever national championship.

International career
Paulo Sérgio played seven times in the 2006 UEFA European Under-21 Championship qualification, netting four goals. He was not, however, selected for the squad that appeared in the final tournament, which was held on home soil.

Previously, Paulo Sérgio appeared with the under-19s in the 2003 European Championship in Liechtenstein, scoring five times in as many matches as the national team lost in the final against Italy.

Club statistics

Honours

Club
AEL Limassol
Cypriot Cup runner-up: 2012–13
Cypriot Super Cup runner-up: 2012

DPMM
S.League: 2015
Singapore Community Shield runner-up: 2016

Bhayangkara
Liga 1: 2017

Bali United
Liga 1: 2019

International
Portugal U19
UEFA European Under-19 Championship runner-up: 2003

Individual
UEFA European Under-19 Championship Top Scorer: 2003
Liga 1 Best Player: 2017
 Liga 1 Best XI: 2017
 Indonesian Soccer Awards: Best 11 2019

References

External links

1984 births
Living people
Footballers from Lisbon
Portuguese footballers
Association football midfielders
Association football wingers
Primeira Liga players
Liga Portugal 2 players
Segunda Divisão players
Sporting CP B players
Sporting CP footballers
Associação Académica de Coimbra – O.A.F. players
C.F. Os Belenenses players
C.F. Estrela da Amadora players
C.D. Aves players
Portimonense S.C. players
S.C. Olhanense players
Vitória S.C. players
F.C. Arouca players
Segunda División players
UD Salamanca players
Cypriot First Division players
AEL Limassol players
Singapore Premier League players
DPMM FC players
Liga 1 (Indonesia) players
Bhayangkara F.C. players
Bali United F.C. players
Portugal youth international footballers
Portugal under-21 international footballers
Portugal B international footballers
Portuguese expatriate footballers
Expatriate footballers in Spain
Expatriate footballers in Cyprus
Expatriate footballers in Brunei
Expatriate footballers in Singapore
Expatriate footballers in Indonesia
Portuguese expatriate sportspeople in Spain
Portuguese expatriate sportspeople in Cyprus
Portuguese expatriate sportspeople in Brunei
Portuguese expatriate sportspeople in Indonesia